The Four Horsemen of the Apocalypse is a 1962 American drama film directed by Vincente Minnelli and starring Glenn Ford, Ingrid Thulin, Charles Boyer, Lee J. Cobb, Paul Lukas, Yvette Mimieux, Karl Boehm and Paul Henreid. It is loosely based on the 1916 novel by Vicente Blasco Ibáñez, which had been filmed in 1921 with Rudolph Valentino. Unlike the first film, it was a critical and commercial disaster, which contributed greatly to the financial problems of MGM.

Plot
In 1936, Madariaga is the 80-year-old patriarch of a cattle ranch in Argentina. His two grandsons are Julio, whose father Marcelo is French, and Heinrich, whose father Karl is German. When Heinrich returns home from studying in Germany to reveal he has become a Nazi, Madariaga slaps him and predicts that the Four Horsemen of the Apocalypse (Conquest, War, Pestilence, and Death) will soon devastate the earth. He runs outside into a storm with visions of the four horsemen and then dies in Julio's arms.

In 1938, Julio goes to Paris with his family and befriends Marcelo's anti-Nazi friend Etienne Laurier. Julio falls in love with Laurier's wife, Marguerite, and becomes her lover after war breaks out and Laurier is sent to a prisoner-of-war camp. He takes advantage of his status as a neutral to live a pleasant life with Marguerite in German-occupied Paris, where his cousin Heinrich is an important official in the SS. When Marguerite becomes the object of German General von Kleig's lust, Julio - aided  by  Heinrich (it being the last time they are on good terms) - defies him and incurs his personal enmity. Julio's younger sister Chi Chi becomes active in the French resistance and makes Julio uncomfortable about his own neutrality. Laurier is released from prison an apparently-broken man, and Marguerite leaves Julio to care for him. When Julio discovers that Laurier is an important figure in the resistance, he joins it as well.

Eventually, both Chi Chi and Laurier are tortured and murdered by the Gestapo, and Laurier reveals to von Kleig that Julio is working for the resistance and on an important mission: guiding Allied bombers to destroy a Nazi headquarters in Normandy. Heinrich, realizing that Julio is probably a French agent, captures him just as the bombs are falling on them and kill both.

The final scene is missing from several versions shown. In it, the grandchildren's parents listen helplessly on the telephone as the deaths happen. The final words are from one set of parents to another: "Our children have killed each other." In other prints, the film ends with the four horsemen riding on to create future havoc for other generations.

Cast

Production

Development
The silent film rights to the original story had been purchased by Metro in 1918 for $190,000. There had been discussions by MGM about remaking the film before the American copyright expired in 1946.

The following year MGM producer Sam Marx announced the studio might remake the film as a vehicle for Ricardo Montalbán, and if they did, the story would be updated to World War II.

Early in 1958, MGM set about clarifying the copyright situation. It had recently authorized a remake of Ben-Hur, which seemed to be a phenomenal success, and it was looking for other old MGM properties to remake. It obtained the necessary rights and announced they would make the movie in June 1958. Julian Blaustein was assigned as producer.

Scripting
Blaustein announced the story would be updated from World War I to World War II:
The driving force of the book is of love among men instead of hatred. I don't think it can be said often enough that such love is indispensable for all of us if we are to have any future. If a motion picture can dramatize such a theme entertainingly then the motion picture may make a small contribution to peace in the world. It certainly impresses me as being worth the try.... The Paris of the occupation, the births of the resistance movements have never been thoroughly explored on the screen to my mind. I'm not interested in trying to recreate the shooting war. That's almost too difficult to realistically do on the screen today. What I want to put on screen is the atmosphere, so that when you sit in the theatre you will feel the hope and frustration of people struggling against invasion and may realize no man is an island.
Robert Ardrey wrote the initial script. The movie was, along with a remake of Cimarron, going to be one of MGM's big films for 1960.

MGM allocated a budget of $4 million and Vincente Minnelli to direct it. He said he had doubts about relocating the time period and wanted it set back in World War I, but the studio was insistent. Filming was pushed back due to the actors strike in 1960.

Minnelli later claimed that he was "drafted" into making the movie, and was rushed into production before he was ready because MGM had a start date. However he managed to get the head of production, Sol Siegel, to arrange for the script to be rewritten in order to reflect the German occupation of Paris. Because Robert Ardrey was busy, MGM hired John Gay to do rewrites of an outline prepared by Minnelli, which showed the weaknesses as he saw them.

"Gay proved to be an enormous help," wrote Minnelli later. "The script – with the dreadful World War II setting – took shape. But I never justified the updating in my mind."

Pre-production commenced in Paris. Minnelli wrote he flew back to the US and tried to talk the studio into changing the time period once again, but it refused. "I began to believe I was the victim of a studio set up," he wrote.

Casting
Early contenders for the male lead, the part originally played by Rudolph Valentino, were MGM contractee George Hamilton, and Maximilian Schell.

Minnelli said that he wanted Alain Delon for the starring role and met with the young actor in Rome, but the producers did not feel that he was well enough known. In June 1960, it was announced that Glenn Ford, who had a long relationship with MGM and had recently signed a new contract with the studio, would play the lead role.

Minnelli later reflected, "There I was, stuck with a story I didn't want to do, with a leading actor who lacked the brashness and impulsiveness I associated with his part. I wanted new challenges but I didn't think they'd be that challenging."

However, he said that the rest of the cast "was as brilliant as it was international." Yvette Mimieux was cast in the ingenue part with Charles Boyer and Claude Dauphin in support, and Ava Gardner in the female lead, the part played by Alice Terry in the 1921 film. Eventually Gardner dropped out and Ingrid Thulin, best known for Wild Strawberries, stepped in. The studio wanted Horst Buchholz to play the young German son but he was unable to do it because of his commitment to make Fanny (1961) and so Karlheinz Böhm instead was hired.

Ford was paired with an older actress, Ingrid Thulin, which made both main roles much older than the book and the 1921 film characters. That gave more credibility to their relationship than a May–December romance would have. Although Thulin spoke English well, she was dubbed by Angela Lansbury.

Shooting
Minnelli later wrote that as he was unhappy with the story he decided to make the film at least as "stunning visually as I could make it. The flaws in the story might be overlooked. Some of my previous pictures hadn't held much hope in the beginning, but they'd been saved because I'd had some leeway in the writing. But I didn't have this freedom on Four Horsemen. It would be interesting to see what could be accomplished."

Minnelli decided to make the Four Horsemen an integral part of the story, which would be designed by Tony Duquette as a set of andirons riding the sky parallel to the main action. He used red as "a dominating color, culminating in a red gel over the newsreels, which would be shown in a documentary way to point up the devastation of the war and the insensitivity of the principal actors in taking scant notice of it."

Filming started in Paris on 17 October.

It proved difficult because of riots from the situation in Algeria and because of the local reluctance to recreate scenes from the Occupation. It was decided to film the bulk of the movie in Hollywood instead.

Saul Bass spent months in 1961, creating four historical newsreel montages, "Sports Palace," "Warsaw," "Rotterdam," "La Martinique," which were to be interspersed throughout the story, but except for brief shots, the montages were removed in the final cut. Bass later reused some of the edits for The Victors, for which he created a prologue and titles.

One of the most famous scenes of the 1921 movie involved Rudolph Valentino dancing the tango. However the scene was not in the novel, and it was decided not to have a similar scene in the remake.

Ingrid Thulin later reflected on filming:
It was an interesting experience. I could not conform to their standards of beauty. I tried.... After the first few rushes it was obvious that it [the film] would turn out badly. Yet they went right on. Perhaps they couldn't convince themselves that all that money would end in disaster. I really did want to be as beautiful as they wanted. It was terribly difficult. Then I worked very hard to dub the dialogue but they kept changing lines to things I couldn't pronounce. So they had to dub in another voice.

MGM was impressed by the performance of Boehm and signed him to a contract by putting him in such films as Come Fly with Me and The Wonderful World of the Brothers Grimm.

Post-production
The movie spent a considerable amount of time in post-production, which caused its budget to increase further. This, combined with the massive cost overruns of Lady L, which had been postponed, and the remake of Mutiny on the Bounty, as well as the massive failures of Cimarron, Mutiny on the Bounty, and this film, led to the resignation of Sol C. Siegel, MGM's head of production.

Reception 
The film had its world premiere on February 7, 1962 at Loew's Capitol Theatre in Washington, DC.

Box office 
The film grossed $26,000 in its first week in Washington, DC. MGM had become aware by April that the film would not recoup its cost and started to write off its losses. Ultimately the movie earned $1,600,000 in theatrical rentals in the US and Canada and $2,500,000 overseas. When costs of prints and advertising were added, the studio recorded a loss of $5,853,000.

Critical 
It was compared very unfavorably to the famous 1921 version, which had propelled Rudolph Valentino to superstardom. Ford, with many films behind him, was not the unknown that Valentino was when he appeared in the 1921 film. Ford, 46, also had the disadvantage of trying to reprise a role that Valentino had played when he was 26. Critics also considered Ford severely miscast as a Latin lover, who in their minds should have been played by someone much younger.

The Los Angeles Times wrote the filmmakers "have pulled it off. The new 'Four Horsemen of the Apocalypse' restores the pleasure there can be in seeing a good story well told on the screen."

Minnelli said that the movie received better reviews in Europe and it influenced the look of The Damned, The Conformist and The Garden of the Finzi Continis.

Soundtrack 
André Previn composed the soundtrack score, the main theme of which Alan and Marilyn Bergman later adapted and wrote lyrics for. The resulting song, "More in Love with You", was recorded by Barbra Streisand for The Movie Album (2003).

Comic book adaptation
 Dell Four Color #1250 (1961)

Bibliography 
 Minnelli, Vincent & Harold Acre, I Remember It Well; Samuel French, 1975.

References

External links 

Review of film at The New York Times

1960s war drama films
1962 films
Films scored by André Previn
Films directed by Vincente Minnelli
Films with screenplays by Robert Ardrey
Films with screenplays by John Gay (screenwriter)
Films about the French Resistance
Films based on works by Vicente Blasco Ibáñez
Films set in Argentina
Films set in Paris
Metro-Goldwyn-Mayer films
Remakes of American films
Sound film remakes of silent films
Films adapted into comics
1960s political drama films
Anti-war films about World War II
Four Horsemen of the Apocalypse in popular culture
1962 drama films
CinemaScope films
1960s English-language films